Studio 8 can refer to:

Studio 8 (company), a production company
Capcom Production Studio 8, a defunct development studio of Capcom USA, Inc.
Macromedia Studio 8, a software suite